Helvibotys freemani is a moth in the family Crambidae described by Eugene G. Munroe in 1976. It lives in Texas, and perhaps elsewhere in North America. The wings are orange with black marginal bands which are thicker in females.

References

Moths described in 1976
Pyraustinae